Gorteria personata is a small annual herbaceous plant in the daisy family (Compositae or Asteraceae). It is endemic to South Africa. It is called bosduifdoring in Afrikaans.

References 

Arctotideae
Endemic flora of South Africa
Plants described in 1759
Taxa named by Carl Linnaeus